The 1945 Gent–Wevelgem was the seventh edition of the Gent–Wevelgem cycle race and was held on 29 July 1945. The race started in Ghent and finished in Wevelgem. The race was won by Robert Van Eenaeme.

General classification

References

Gent–Wevelgem
1945 in road cycling
1945 in Belgian sport
July 1945 sports events in Europe